Native North American may refer to:

Indigenous peoples in Canada
Native Americans in the United States
Alaska Natives
Indigenous peoples of Mexico
Northern Native American (genetic lineage)